Chapo Lake (Spanish: Lago Chapo) is a lake of Chile located in Los Lagos Region. It lies immediately southeast of Calbuco volcano and south of Llanquihue National Reserve. Just south of the lake is Alerce Andino National Park.

Reloncaví Estuary receives the outflow of Chapo lake.

References
Lago Chapo 

Lakes of Chile
Lakes of Los Lagos Region